Hristo Stoichkov (born 8 February 1966) is a Bulgarian former professional footballer who is a football commentator for TUDN. A prolific forward, he is regarded as one of the best players of his generation and is regarded as the greatest Bulgarian footballer of all time. He was runner-up for the FIFA World Player of the Year award in 1992 and 1994, and received the Ballon d'Or in 1994. In 2004, Stoichkov was named by Pelé in the FIFA 100 list of the world's greatest living players.

At club level, Stoichkov spent six years at CSKA Sofia and became the top goalscorer in Europe in 1990, receiving the European Golden Shoe. In 1990, he joined Barcelona where he earned the Spanish nickname "El Pistolero" ("The Gunslinger"), and was part of Johan Cruyff's "Dream Team" that won four consecutive La Liga titles and the 1992 European Cup. During his time at the club, he formed a prolific strike partnership with Romário. Cruyff was largely instrumental in bringing him to Barcelona where he quickly developed into one of the most prolific forwards in the world.

Stoichkov was a member of the Bulgaria national team that finished fourth at the 1994 FIFA World Cup, of which he was the top scorer with six goals and received the World Cup Golden Boot. He was ranked the third-best player at the World Cup, after Romário and Roberto Baggio, and received the World Cup Bronze Ball. Apart from his footballing talent, he was notable for his on-pitch temper. In his playing career, he was also nicknamed The Dagger (Камата).

Club career

Early career
Stoichkov was born in the city of Plovdiv.

Stoichkov began his football career playing for hometown club Maritsa Plovdiv at age 11. In 1982, he moved to Hebros Harmanli, scoring 14 goals in the third level of Bulgarian football.

CSKA Sofia
In early 1985, Stoichkov joined CSKA Sofia. At the beginning of his five-year stay at CSKA, Stoichkov (who later became famous for his short temper) became involved in a fight during the 1985 Bulgarian Cup Final, which resulted in an original lifelong ban, later reduced to an year suspension. He made his comeback for CSKA on 30 April 1986, in a 3–1 away win over Sliven in a game of the Cup of the Soviet Army. On 21 May, Stoichkov opened the scoring in the final of tournament against Lokomotiv Sofia, which CSKA won 2–0.

He continued his progress during 1986–87, becoming a regular in the left side of CSKA's attack. Stoichkov collected his first A Group title winner's medal at the end of the season. He scored 6 league goals that season.

Stoichkov managed to win the European Golden Boot with CSKA by scoring 38 goals in 30 matches during the 1989–90 A Group season.

Barcelona
After five years with CSKA, Stoichkov transferred to Barcelona. In his first season with the club, Stoichkov was suspended for two months for stomping on a referee's foot, but he still scored 14 league goals and 6 more in the European Cup Winners' Cup. He became part of manager Johan Cruyff's "Dream Team" and helped Barcelona to one of the most successful eras of the club, winning La Liga four years in a row between 1991 and 1994 and the European Cup after defeating Sampdoria in 1992.  During his stay in Barcelona, he became an idol for the club's fans, and played in tandem with Romário in attack. Stoichkov was also known for making sure Romario attended training sessions on time, as the latter often indulged in late-night fiestas. Stoichkov was twice named runner up for the FIFA World Player of the Year, in 1992 and 1994, and he won the 1994 Ballon d'Or after leading his national team to the 1994 World Cup semi-finals.

Later career
Stoichkov then had a short spell in Italy with Parma scoring a total of seven goals and soon returned to FC Barcelona where he played until early '98. He also had a second stint with CSKA Sofia in the spring of 1998. In April 1998 he signed a two-match contract for Saudi Arabian club Al-Nassr helping them win the Asian Cup Winners' Cup. In the semi-final against Kopetdag, he earned a penalty and assisted the winning goal and in the final against Suwon Bluewings, he scored the only goal in the 12th minute. For those two games Hristo received $200.000. He subsequently went in Japan to play with Kashiwa Reysol, before finishing his career in the United States with the Chicago Fire and D.C. United, winning the U.S. Open Cup (and scoring the first goal in the final) with the former.

International career
Stoichkov debuted for the Bulgaria national team in a UEFA Euro 1988 qualifying match against Belgium on 23 September 1987. He scored his first international goal in his fourth appearance, a 3–2 friendly defeat of Qatar in Doha.

During qualification for the 1994 FIFA World Cup, Stoichkov scored five goals to help Bulgaria qualify for its first major tournament since the 1986 World Cup. At the tournament finals, Stoichkov was awarded the World Cup Golden Boot as the joint top goal scorer of the tournament (with Oleg Salenko), with six goals, as well as earning the Bronze Ball award. He led Bulgaria past Germany in the quarter-finals 2–1, a shock result as Germany were the then-defending champions. In the semi-finals, Bulgaria lost 2–1 to Italy. They subsequently lost the third place play-off to Sweden, 4–0.

Bulgaria finished second in the qualifying group for Euro 1996 behind Germany. Stoichkov scored ten goals for his team during the qualifiers, as Bulgaria qualified as one of the best six runners-up. In the first match against Germany in Sofia, Bulgaria were 2–0 down at half-time. Stoichkov equalized with two goals from penalties and Emil Kostadinov also scored for a 3–2 win. Bulgaria lost the second match in Germany 3–1. During the finals, Bulgaria lost 3–1 in the decisive group match against a strong France side; in the other match, Spain won 2–1 against Romania and so the Bulgarians went out. In that tournament, Stoichkov scored three goals in three matches.

He was also part of the squad that was eliminated in the first round of the 1998 World Cup. Bulgaria was not nearly as strong as in previous years, earning only one point in a 0–0 draw against Paraguay and scoring only one goal through Kostadinov in a 6–1 defeat by Spain. Stoichkov retired from internationals in 1999 with 37 goals in 83 appearances. His last game was during the Euro 2000 Qualification against England which ended 1-1 and Stoichkov assisted Georgi Markov for the equalizer goal from free kick goal. In the same game he was substituted with Martin Petrov for whom it was debut with Bulgarian shirt. Ironically, both are Bulgaria's only goalscorers in a UEFA Euro Tournament, Stoichkov was the only Goalscorer in 1996 with 3 Goals while Petrov in 2004 in the 2–1 loss against Italy. Bulgaria failed to Qualify for the Euro 2000 in Belgium and the Netherlands after the game, as they needed a win to have chances to qualify.

He later served as coach of the Bulgaria national team from 2004 to April 2007.

Style of play

Stoichkov had explosive pace, and was a creative, tenacious and prolific left-footed forward who was primarily used as a striker, but was also capable of playing in a creative role, as an attacking midfielder, due to his ability to provide assists for teammates. He was also deployed as a supporting striker throughout his career, forming a strike partnership with Romário at Barcelona, and occasionally he played as a right winger during his time at the club, although he was also capable of playing on the left or through the middle. In his early years he also used to play as a left full-back. A powerful, physically strong and technically gifted player, Stoichkov was known for his explosive acceleration, and his dribbling ability at speed, as well as for his tendency to take unpredictable, powerful shots on goal. The top goalscorer at the 1994 World Cup, he was also notable at taking free-kicks and penalties, as well as being a very good crosser and passer of the ball. Manager Dimitar Dimitrov described Stoichkov as "one of the greatest players of all time" in 2006, and as a player who had "a winning mentality."

Stoichkov was criticised for his work-rate at times, and he also gained infamy because of his aggressive temper on the pitch; he could often be seen arguing with the referee, or with his opponents. At Euro 1996, after Bulgaria's final group stage match against France, he was accused by French defender Marcel Desailly of making insulting remarks about Desailly's race.

In 2006, he was sued by a former American University college student whose leg he broke with a violent tackle while playing in a friendly match for D.C. United in 2003. The case was settled out of court in 2007 with undisclosed financial terms. The student's coach called Stoichkov's challenge "criminal". Ray Hudson, who coached D.C. United for whom Stoichkov played at the time, called it a "rash tackle". Following an investigation by Major League Soccer (MLS), Stoichkov was suspended two games and fined US$2,000.

Media
Stoichkov features in EA Sports' FIFA video game series; he was included in the FIFA 15 Ultimate Team Legends.

In 2018 he published his authorized biography "Hristo Stoichkov. The Story". The official unveiling of the autobiography in November was attended by many footballers, other sportspeople, former Bulgarian presidents Petar Stoyanov, Georgi Parvanov and Rosen Plevneliev as well as former Spanish referee Idefonso Urízar Azpitarte, who had sent off Stoichkov during the first match of the 1990 Spanish Super Cup final and was given the opportunity to symbolically stomp on Stoichkov's foot.

Managing career
In the 2003–04 season, Stoichkov started a managing career, serving as a forwards coach at Barcelona. After Bulgarian national team manager Plamen Markov resigned in the wake of the team's first-round exit from Euro 2004, the Bulgarian Football Union named him as the new national team manager on 15 July.

Stoichkov's managing career got off to a poor start, with him failing to lead Bulgaria to qualification for the 2006 World Cup. He brought his bad temper from his career as a player to the bench. A couple of proven players quit the team due to personal differences with Stoichkov. The most notable scandal was on 5 September 2005, in a game against Sweden, where he was sent-off for insulting the referee.

The biggest blow to Stoichkov as a manager of the national team of Bulgaria came on 12 October 2006, when Stiliyan Petrov, the captain of the team, announced he would not play for Bulgaria so long as Stoichkov was manager. Petrov was the third player and the second captain in two years to leave the team because of differences with Stoichkov. On 17 March 2007, however, Petrov announced that he had had a private conversation with Stoichkov, in which they were able to work their differences out. As a result, Petrov would return to the team.

On 10 April 2007, the Bulgarian Football Union announced they had accepted the resignation of Stoichkov from his post with the national team. That was as a result of the poor performance of the team at the ongoing Euro 2008 qualifying campaign, followed by widely spread criticism and debate over the qualities of the manager. The specific game, which led to increased pressure on Stoichkov, was the 0–0 home draw with Albania (despite the fact that the Bulgarians generally controlled the game and hit the post twice). He had a short disappointing stint as manager at Celta Vigo, for which he was sacked following the team's slump that took them to the lower reaches of the Spanish Second Division. On 8 October 2007, he was replaced by ex-Real Madrid manager Juan Ramón López Caro. On 12 March 2009, Stoichkov visited the Manchester City training ground after requesting a visit.

On 29 June 2009, Stoichkov moved to Mamelodi Sundowns, where he replaced Henri Michel. On 16 March 2010, he quit Mamelodi Sundowns, with the former South Africa national team manager Trott Moloto named caretaker until a full-time replacement is found.

In 2011, the Vietnam Football Federation invited Stoichkov to become the head manager of Vietnam national team; however, he declined the position. In the 2011–12 season, he worked as an advisor at Russian club Rostov.

In January 2012, Stoichkov was appointed manager of Bulgarian side Litex Lovech, replacing Lyuboslav Penev, who left to become manager of the Bulgaria national team. In May 2013, Stoichkov was recognized as the A PFG manager of the season following a vote by the professional footballers in the Bulgarian league. In June 2013, he was named the manager of Bulgarian powerhouse – and former club – CSKA Sofia, but quit one month later after he lost faith in the troubled club.

Career statistics

Club

International

Scores and results list Bulgaria's goal tally first, score column indicates score after each Stoichkov goal.

Managerial statistics

Honours

Player
CSKA Sofia
A Group: 1986–87, 1988–89, 1989–90
Bulgarian Cup: 1984–85, 1986–87, 1987–88, 1988–89
Soviet Army Cup: 1984-85, 1985-86, 1988-89, 1989-90
Bulgarian Supercup: 1989

Barcelona
La Liga: 1990–91, 1991–92, 1992–93, 1993–94, 1997–98
Copa del Rey: 1996–97, 1997–98
Supercopa de España: 1991, 1992, 1994, 1996;   Runner up:1990, 1993, 1997
UEFA Champions League: 1991–92;   Runner up:1993–94
European Cup Winners' Cup: 1996–97;   Runner up: 1990–91
UEFA Super Cup: 1992, 1997
Intercontinental Cup:   Runner up:1992

Parma
 Supercoppa Italiana:   Runner up:1995

Al-Nassr
Asian Cup Winners' Cup: 1997–98

Kashiwa Reysol
Japan Soccer League Cup / J.League Cup: 1999

Chicago Fire
U.S. Open Cup: 2000
Central Division: 2000, 2001
MLS Cup 2000: Runner-up

Bulgaria
FIFA World Cup Semi-finals (4th place): 1994 Bronze Medal

Individual
Ballon d'Or: 1994
European Golden Shoe: 1990
European Cup Winners' Cup Top Scorer: 1989
UNICEF European Footballer of the Season: 1991–92
UEFA Men's Player of the Year Award / Onze d'Or: 1992
Don Balón Award Best Foreigh Player in La Liga: 1993-94
IFFHS World's Top Goal Scorer: 1994
UEFA Men's Player of the Year Award / Onze d'Argent: 1994
FIFA World Player of the Year: Runner-up: 1992, 1994
FIFA World Cup Golden Shoe: 1994
FIFA World Cup Bronze Ball: 1994
FIFA World Cup All-Star Team: 1994
Bulgarian Footballer of the Year(5): 1989, 1990, 1991, 1992, 1994
A Group Top scorer(2): 1988–89, 1989–90
Bulgarian Sportsperson of the Year: 1994
UEFA European Championship Team of the Tournament: 1996
MLS Best XI: 2000
The Era of the 'Dream Team' (1988-1996) - Barcelona Legend
[[World Soccer players of the 20th century|''World Soccers 100 Greatest Players of the 20th Century]]: 2000
UEFA Jubilee Awards – Greatest Bulgarian Footballer of the last 50 Years: 2004
FIFA 100: 2004
Golden Foot: 2007, as football legend
 Sport Movies & TV – Milano International FICTS Fest - FICTS "Hall of Fame": 2013
UNESCO Goodwill Ambassador - UNESCO Champion for Sport: 2016
IFFHS: 2019, as football legend
Fans Award - The Best FC Barcelona Players Of All Time: 2021Fans Award - The Best FC Barcelona Players Of All Time
FourFourTwo - The 50 greatest Barcelona players of all time: 2022
FourFourTwo - The 100 best football players of all time: 2022RecordsAll-time the only Football Player won Edition of the European Cup Winners' Cup and Asian Cup Winners' Cup.
All-time Top Scorer in the Bulgarian First Professional Football League with 38 league goals in 30 games - season 1989–90.
All-time FC Barcelona player with most red cards in the history (10 Red cards).

ManagerMamelodi SundownsPremier Soccer League runner-up: 2009–10Individual'''
Premier Soccer League: Coach of the Month: December 2009

Further honours
In November 2003, to celebrate UEFA's Jubilee, he was selected as the Golden Player of Bulgaria by the Bulgarian Football Union as their most outstanding player of the past 50 years.
He was named by Pelé as one of the 125 Greatest Living Footballers at a FIFA Awards ceremony in 2004.
Eurosport made a voting in 2005 there Fans could decide who was the best Player in the 90s and Stoichkov won the Award.
In 2011 he was named honorary consul of Bulgaria in Barcelona. In October 2017 he was removed from the position on the request of the Spanish government over his criticisms of this government (especially the deputy prime minister, Soraya Sáenz de Santamaría) in relation with the Catalan independence referendum, as well as the fact that he lives mainly in the United States.

Barcelona (official) 
 Copa Generalitat: 1991, 1993
 Trofeo Ciudad de La Línea: 1991
 Trofeo Ciudad de Marbella: 1993
 Teresa Herrera Trophy: 1990, 1993
 Trofeo Ciudad de Oviedo: 1996
 Joan Gamper Trophy: 1990, 1991, 1992, 1993, 1994, 1996, 1997

Notes

References

External links

Stoichkov`s goal (FK) J.League official
Hristo Stoichkov on BarcaMania.com
Autobiography
Stoichkov  Profile, stats and news
UEFA.com – Golden Player of Bulgaria

1966 births
Living people
Footballers from Plovdiv
Bulgarian footballers
Association football forwards
FC Maritsa Plovdiv players
PFC CSKA Sofia players
FC Barcelona players
Parma Calcio 1913 players
Al Nassr FC players
Kashiwa Reysol players
Chicago Fire FC players
D.C. United players
First Professional Football League (Bulgaria) players
La Liga players
Serie A players
Saudi Professional League players
J1 League players
Major League Soccer players
UEFA Champions League winning players
Ballon d'Or winners
Catalonia international guest footballers
Bulgaria international footballers
1994 FIFA World Cup players
UEFA Euro 1996 players
1998 FIFA World Cup players
UEFA Golden Players
FIFA 100
Bulgarian expatriate footballers
Bulgarian expatriate sportspeople in Spain
Bulgarian expatriate sportspeople in Italy
Bulgarian expatriate sportspeople in Saudi Arabia
Bulgarian expatriate sportspeople in Japan
Bulgarian expatriate sportspeople in the United States
Expatriate footballers in Spain
Expatriate footballers in Italy
Expatriate footballers in Saudi Arabia
Expatriate footballers in Japan
Expatriate soccer players in the United States
Bulgarian football managers
FC Barcelona non-playing staff
Bulgaria national football team managers
RC Celta de Vigo managers
Mamelodi Sundowns F.C. managers
PFC Litex Lovech managers
PFC CSKA Sofia managers
La Liga managers
Bulgarian expatriate football managers
Bulgarian expatriate sportspeople in South Africa
Expatriate football managers in Spain
Expatriate soccer managers in South Africa
Honorary consuls of Bulgaria